The Scots Wikipedia is the Scots-language edition of the free online encyclopedia, Wikipedia. It was established on 23 June 2005, and it first reached 1,000 articles in February 2006, and 5,000 articles in November 2010. The Scots Wikipedia is one of eight Wikipedias written in an Anglic language or English-based pidgin/creole, the others being the English Wikipedia, the Simple English Wikipedia, the Old English Wikipedia, the Pitkern-Norfuk Wikipedia, the Tok Pisin Wikipedia, the Jamaican Patois Wikipedia, and the Sranan Tongo Wikipedia.

In August 2020, the wiki received scrutiny from the media for the poor quality of its Scots writing and the discovery that at least 20,000 articles had been written by an editor who did not speak the language. This attention led to a review of the wiki's content by Scots speakers as well as editors from the wider Wikipedia community. Most of the editor's articles have been deleted, which is evident in the decrease in the total number of articles from about 55,000 in 2018 to about 40,000 in 2021.

Reception 
By February 2008, the site contained 2,200 articles and had outpaced Māori Wikipedia and Kashmiri Wikipedia.  Reported reception, however, was mixed; Scotland on Sunday literary editor described it as "convoluted at best, and an absolute parody at worst", while Ted Brocklebank, culture spokesman for the Scottish Tories, described it as a "cheap attempt at creating a language".  However, Chris Robinson, director of the Dictionary of the Scots Language, wrote: "The fact it is doing well gives a lie to all those people who decry Scots and try to do it down." In 2014, Jane C. Hu of Slate described the site as reading "like a transcription of a person [speaking English] with a Scottish accent" and said one Wikipedia editor had proposed that the project be closed, in the mistaken belief that it was a practical joke.

Controversy 
In August 2020, the site attracted attention after a Reddit post noted that the project contained an unusually high number of articles written in poor quality Scots by a single prolific contributor, who was an American teenager. These articles were written with mostly English instead of Scots vocabulary and grammar and apparently using an online English–Scots dictionary to crudely translate parts of English Wikipedia articles. Over 23,000 articles, approximately a third of the entire Scots Wikipedia at that time, were created by this contributor. These articles have been described as "English written in a Scottish accent" with gibberish and nonsensical words and spellings not present in any Scots dialect. 

In response to the controversy, the Scots Wikipedia started a review of its articles for language inaccuracies, and deleted many of the affected articles.

Robert McColl Millar, professor in linguistics and Scottish language at the University of Aberdeen, has said that the affected articles displayed "a very limited knowledge both of Modern Scots and its earlier manifestations". Michael Dempster, director of the Scots Language Centre, contacted the Wikimedia Foundation over the possibility of building upon the Scots Wikipedia's existing infrastructure, describing the renewed interest in the site as having "potential to be a great online focus" for the Scots language.

Statistics

See also 
 List of Wikipedias

Notes

References

External links 

  Scots Wikipedia
 Statistics for Scots Wikipedia by Erik Zachte.

Wikipedias by language
Internet properties established in 2005
Wikipedia
Scottish encyclopedias
Wikipedia controversies
Wikipedias in Germanic languages